In baseball statistics, slugging percentage (SLG) is a measure of the batting productivity of a hitter. It is calculated as total bases divided by at bats. Unlike batting average, slugging percentage gives more weight to extra-base hits with doubles, triples, and home runs, relative to singles. Plate appearances ending in walks are specifically excluded from this calculation, as an appearance that ends in a walk is not counted as an at bat.

Babe Ruth is the all-time leader with a career slugging percentage of .6897. Ted Williams (.6338), Lou Gehrig (.6324), Mule Suttles (.6179), Turkey Stearnes (.6165), Oscar Charleston (.6145), Jimmie Foxx (.6093), Barry Bonds (.6069), and Hank Greenberg (.6050) are the only other players with a career slugging percentage over .600.

Key

List

Stats updated as of the end of the 2022 season.

Notes

Sources

Slugging percentage 5
Major League Baseball statistics